Wahshi ibn Harb ("The Savage, Son of War"), also known as Abu Dusmah was a former slave of Jubayr ibn Mut'im before becoming a freedman and a Sahabi (companion of the Islamic prophet Muhammad). He is best known for killing a leading Muslim fighter, Hamza ibn ‘Abd al-Muttalib, Muhammad's  uncle, prior to accepting Islam, and afterwards reportedly killing Musaylimah, the leader of an enemy apostate army who were waging war against the Muslims.

During the Battle of Uhud

Wahshi (وحشي, which means "the savage" or "the wild one") had been appointed by Hind bint Utbah to kill one of the three persons (Muhammad,  Ali ibn Abi Talib, or Hamza ibn ‘Abd al-Muttalib) so that she might avenge her father's death during the Battle of Badr.

Wahshi said in reply, "I didn't approached Muhammad at all, because his companions are nearer to him than anyone else. Ali too is extraordinarily vigilant in the battlefield. However, Hamza is so furious that, while fighting, he does not pay any attention to any other side and it is possible that I may be able to make him fall by some trick or by taking him unawares." Hind was content with this and promised that if he was successful in performing the job she would set him free. Some believe that Jubair made this promise to his slave (Wahshi) as his (Jubayr's) uncle had been killed in the Battle of Badr.

Conversion to Islam
He then later converted to Islam and claimed to have killed the non-Islamic prophet Musaylimah (also known as Musaylimah al-Kadhdhaab meaning "Musaylimah the Liar") during the battle of Yamama in 632. Wahshi relates his story of conversion:

See also

List of non-Arab Sahaba
Sunni view of the Sahaba

References

Companions of the Prophet
Non-Arab companions of the Prophet